Sophia Popov (born 2 October 1992) is a German professional golfer.

Personal life
Popov holds dual United States-German citizenship having been born in the United States, and moved to Germany with her family when she was four years old. Her paternal grandparents are Bulgarian.

Amateur career
As an amateur, she played college golf at the University of Southern California in Los Angeles. She won the 2010 International European Ladies Amateur Championship and played on the Junior Solheim Cup and Espirito Santo Trophy teams.

Professional career
In 2015, Popov was part of the German broadcast team for German television during the Solheim Cup.

Popov played on the Symetra Tour between 2016 and 2020, where she had a best of four runner-up finishes: 2016 Chico's Patty Berg Memorial, 2016 Danielle Downey Credit Union Classic, 2017 Tullymore Classic and 2020 Founders Tribute at Longbow. In 2016, she qualified for the U.S. Women's Open at CordeValle, where she finished last of those making the cut, and in 2018 she played in the Women's PGA Championship at Kemper Lakes, finishing tied for 57th place.

In February 2019, Popov came within a stroke of gaining a place on the LPGA Tour for the 2019 season via the qualifying school. In 2020, with the LPGA and Symetra tours being impacted by the COVID-19 pandemic, she won three tournaments on the Cactus Tour, a mini-tour based in Arizona. She followed that up with victory in the AIG Women's Open at Royal Troon, having qualified by means of a high finish at the Marathon Classic. Prior to the Women's Open, Popov was ranked 304th in the world.

Amateur wins
2008 European Ladies' Club Trophy (individual), German Girls Championship (Under-16)
2009 European Ladies' Club Trophy (individual)
2010 International European Ladies Amateur Championship, PAC 10-SEC Challenge
2011 PING/ASU Invitational, PAC-10 Championship
2012 Battle at Rancho Bernardo
2013 SDSU Farms Invitational

Source:

Professional wins (4)

LPGA Tour wins (1)

Cactus Tour wins (3)
2020 Event 14, Event 16, Event 20

Major championships

Wins (1)

Results timeline
Results generally not in chronological order.

CUT = missed the half-way cut
NT = no tournament
T = tied

Team appearances
Amateur
European Girls' Team Championship (representing Germany): 2008. 2009
Junior Solheim Cup (representing Europe): 2009
Espirito Santo Trophy (representing Germany): 2010, 2012
European Ladies' Team Championship  (representing Germany): 2011, 2013, 2014
Vagliano Trophy (representing Continent of Europe): 2011 (winners), 2013 (winners)

Professional
Solheim Cup (representing Europe): 2021 (winners)

Solheim Cup record

References

External links

USC Trojans – Sophia Popov

German female golfers
LPGA Tour golfers
Winners of LPGA major golf championships
Olympic golfers of Germany
Golfers at the 2020 Summer Olympics
USC Trojans women's golfers
American people of German descent
American people of Bulgarian descent
German people of Bulgarian descent
Sportspeople from Karlsruhe (region)
1992 births
Living people